The 2023 Grand Prix Hassan II is a professional tennis tournament to be played in Marrakesh, Morocco on clay courts. It will be the 37th edition of the tournament and is classified as an ATP Tour 250 event on the 2023 ATP Tour. It will take place from 3 to 9 April 2023.

Champions

Singles 

  vs

Doubles 

  /  vs  /

Point and prize money

Point

Prize money 

*per team

Singles main draw entrants

Seeds 

† Rankings are as of 20 March 2023

Other entrants 
The following players received wildcard entry into the singles main draw: 
   
   
   

The following players received entry from qualifying draw:

Doubles main draw entrants

Seeds

 Rankings are as of 20 March 2023

Other entrants 
The following pairs received wildcards into the doubles main draw:
  /  
  /

References

External links 

 

Grand Prix Hassan II
Grand Prix Hassan II
Grand Prix Hassan II
Grand Prix Hassan II